Elodea canadensis (American waterweed or Canadian waterweed or pondweed) is a perennial aquatic plant, or submergent macrophyte, native to most of North America. It has been introduced widely to regions outside its native range and was first recorded from the British Isles in about 1836.

Distribution
The native range of the species lies within North America, but it has been introduced in many parts of the world either intentionally or not. Europe has been particularly affected with the first record dating back as far as 1836. Since then, the species' presence has been confirmed in all continental European countries.

Records of the species' presence in Ireland include: County Galway, found at several sites along the Eglinton Canal, County Galway,
County Down. and from the Lagan Canal near Lisburn, Northern Ireland.

Description
Young plants initially start with a seedling stem with roots growing in mud at the bottom of the water; further adventitious roots are produced at intervals along the stem, which may hang free in the water or anchor into the bottom. It grows indefinitely at the stem tips, and single specimens may reach lengths of 3 m or more.

The leaves are bright green, translucent, oblong, 6–17 mm long and 1–4 mm broad, borne in whorls of three (rarely two or four) round the stem. It lives entirely underwater, the only exception being the small white or pale purple flowers which float at the surface and are attached to the plant by delicate stalks.These stalks, or hypanthia, are the lower part of the petals joined to form a floral tube. This floral tube can be up to 30 centimeters (12 inches) in length, while only  1/25 inch (one millimeter) in width. for a length to length to width ratio of 300.  However, according to one article, this ratio can sometimes be as much as one thousand,  making this species, by a wide margin, "the skinniest of all flowers".

It is dioecious, with male and female flowers on different plants. The flowers have three small white petals; male flowers have 4.5–5 mm petals and nine stamens, female flowers have 2–3 mm petals and three fused carpels. The fruit is an ovoid capsule, about 6 mm long containing several seeds that ripen underwater. The seeds are 4–5 mm long, spindle-shaped and smooth.  It flowers from May to October.

It grows rapidly in favorable conditions and can choke shallow ponds, canals, and the margins of some slow-flowing rivers. It requires summer water temperatures of 10–25 °C and moderate-to-bright light levels.

It is closely related to Elodea nuttallii, which generally has narrower leaves under 2 mm broad. It is usually fairly easy to distinguish from its relatives, like the Brazilian Egeria densa and Hydrilla verticillata. These all have leaves in whorls around the stem; however, Elodea usually has three leaves per whorl, whereas Egeria and Hydrilla usually have four or more. Egeria densa is also a larger, bushier plant, with longer leaves.

Cultivation and uses 
It is frequently used as an aquarium plant. Propagation is by cuttings.

It is an invasive species in Europe, Asia, Africa, and Oceania. It was introduced into County Down, Ireland in about 1836, and appeared in Great Britain in 1841, spreading through both countries in ponds, ditches and streams, which were often choked with its rank growth.

Other common names for this plant include Anacharis (an older name for the genus Elodea), water thyme, common elodea, and ditch moss.

Gallery

References 

Hydrocharitaceae
Freshwater plants
Flora of North America
Plants described in 1803
Dioecious plants